Thomas Peter McIntyre (born 6 November 1998) is a Scottish professional footballer who plays for the EFL Championship club Reading as a defender.

Career

Club
In July 2016, McIntyre signed his first professional deal with Reading, signing a new deal until the summer of 2020 on 3 January 2018. McIntyre became the 48th graduate from Reading Academy when he made his debut in a  1–1 draw against Rotherham United on 15 December 2018, earning man of the match. After the game it was revealed he had played with a fractured forehead and required surgery for metal plates to be fitted. He was consequently ruled out of playing any further games for a few months.

On 26 February 2019, McIntyre signed a new contract with Reading until the summer of 2021.

McIntyre scored his first goal for Reading in a 2–1 win over Luton Town on 26 December 2020.

With his contract due to expire on 30 June 2021, McIntyre signed a new three-year contract with Reading on 29 June 2021, keeping him at the club until the summer of 2024.

International
McIntyre has represented Scotland at U17 and U20 before making his U21 debut against Netherlands on 11 September 2018.

Personal life
McIntyre is a keen gamer and has a Twitch channel where he streams himself playing FIFA and Call of Duty. He currently has 160 victories on Warzone.

Career statistics

Club

References

External links
 
 Reading Profile

1998 births
Living people
Scottish footballers
Association football defenders
Reading F.C. players
English Football League players
Scotland youth international footballers
Scotland under-21 international footballers
Twitch (service) streamers